Matthew Thomas Schobel (born November 4, 1978) is a former American football tight end. He was drafted by the Cincinnati Bengals in the third round of the 2002 NFL Draft. He played college football at Texas Christian University (TCU).

Schobel was also a member of the Philadelphia Eagles. Matt is the younger brother of former defensive end Aaron Schobel and the cousin of former defensive end Bo Schobel.

Schobel is currently the head coach of his high school alma mater, the Columbus High School Cardinals.

Early years
Schobel attended Columbus High School in Columbus, Texas. He played football there as a quarterback.
He was 2nd leg in 4 x 100 meter relay team, as well as an excellent basketball player known for dunking.

College career
Schobel originally signed with Texas A&M as a quarterback in 1997.  He was redshirted as a freshman, and decided to transfer to Texas Christian University, sitting out the 1998 season per NCAA transfer rules.  Due to his size and surprising quickness and mobility, he was converted to tight end in 2000 and played three seasons (1999–2001) at Texas Christian University.

Professional career

Cincinnati Bengals
Schobel was drafted by the Cincinnati Bengals in the third round (the 67th player overall) of the 2002 NFL Draft.

Schobel played four years with the Bengals where he tallied 90 receptions for 938 yards and nine touchdowns.

Philadelphia Eagles
In 2006, Schobel became an unrestricted free agent and signed a five-year contract with the Philadelphia Eagles.

Through 2008, Schobel had seen action in 36 games, starting 11.  He had 27 receptions for 332 yards and three touchdowns. He was released on September 5, 2009.

References

External links
 Philadelphia Eagles bio
 Draft scout report

1978 births
Living people
American football tight ends
Cincinnati Bengals players
People from Columbus, Texas
Philadelphia Eagles players
TCU Horned Frogs football players
Players of American football from Texas